Gurjeet Singh Aujla is an Indian politician and a member of Indian National Congress and current member of Parliament for Amritsar in Punjab, India.

Political career

On 11 March 2017 he won the by-poll to the Lok Sabha seat which was necessitated due to the vacancy caused by the resignation of Captain Amarinder Singh in 2016. Gurjeet Singh Aujla defeated BJP nominee Rajinder Mohan Singh Chhina by a margin of 1,97,491 votes. AAP candidate Upkar Singh Sandhu secured 1,49,160 votes to finish third.

Gurjeet Singh Aujla again won Amritsar Lok Sabha seat in 2019 Indian general election defeating Union minister Hardeep Singh Puri. Aujla got 4,44,052 (51.78%) votes while Puri finished second with 3,44,049 (40.19%) votes.

Electoral performance

References

Lok Sabha members from Punjab, India
Living people
India MPs 2014–2019
Politicians from Amritsar district
1972 births
India MPs 2019–present